The White Mulde is the right headstream of the Zwickauer Mulde in the Vogtland region of Saxony, Germany.

Course 
Its source is in the pond of Oberer Muldeteich. The White Mulde runs in a northerly direction, through the Unterer Muldeteich and discharges after about 3 km into the Muldenberg Reservoir. There it unites with the Red Mulde to form the Zwickauer Mulde.

See also
List of rivers of Saxony

References 

Rivers of Saxony
Vogtland
Rivers of the Ore Mountains
Rivers of Germany